Plakobranchus ocellatus is a species of sea slug, a sacoglossan, a marine opisthobranch gastropod mollusk in the family Plakobranchidae. It is found in shallow water in the Indo-Pacific region.

Distribution 
This species occurs in the Indo-Pacific. Recent work on the photosynthetic abilities of Plakobranchus reveals that P. ocellatus is actually a species complex consisting of at least four distinct clades.

Description 

The head is flat and squarish, the rhinophores being folded longitudinally. The mouth is at the front apex of the head and the eyes are very close together, being visible through the semi-transparent skin of the head. The dorsal surface of the sea slug has a number of longitudinal ridges, but when at rest, the parapodia are folded up over the midline of the body so that the dorsal surface is concealed from view. On the underside, the foot is broad and long, but is not clearly demarcated from the mantle.
The ground colour of this sea slug is usually pale green, beige, or cream with large ocelli (spots similar to eyespots) of cream, brown, pink, and purple in varying shades. The sole of the foot also has ocelli.

Habitat
These seaslugs live in sheltered, shallow water habitats with stones or gravel and silt. They feed on a broad food spectrum, including members of the genera Halimeda, Caulerpa, Udotea, Acetabularia and further unidentified algae, with an emphasis on Halimeda macroloba.

References 
This article incorporates CC-BY-3.0 text from the reference. 

 Jensen K.R. (2007) Biogeography of the Sacoglossa (Mollusca, Opisthobranchia). Bonner Zoologische Beiträge 55:255–281

External links 

 Hirose E. (2005). "Digestive System of the Sacoglossan Plakobranchus ocellatus (Gastropoda: Opisthobranchia): Light- and Electron-Microscopic Observations with Remarks on Chloroplast Retention". Zoolog Sci. 22(8): 905–916.
 Trench M. E, Trench R. K. & Muscatine L. (1970). "Utilization of photosynthetic products of symbiotic chloroplasts in mucus synthesis by Placobranchus ianthobapsus (Gould), Opisthobranchia, Sacoglossa". Comp Biochem Physiol. 37(1): 113–117.
 

Plakobranchidae
Gastropods described in 1824